The 2020–21 Big East Conference men's basketball season began with practices in October 2020, followed by the start of the 2020–21 NCAA Division I men's basketball season in November. Conference play began in January 2021.

Head coaches

Coaching changes

Coaches 

Notes: 
 Years at school includes 2020–21 season.
 Overall and Big East records are from time at current school and are through week nine of the 2019–20 season. 
 McDermott's MVC conference records and Hurley's AAC records not included since team began play in the Big East.

Preseason

Preseason poll 
Prior to the season, the Big East conducted a poll of Big East coaches. Coaches do not place their own team on their ballots.

Preseason All-Big East teams

*Schedule Source:

Regular season

Rankings

Conference matrix
This table summarizes the head-to-head results between teams in conference play.

Player of the week
Throughout the season, the Big East Conference named a player of the week and a freshman of the week each Monday.

Honors and awards

Big East Awards

References

External links
Big East website